The Lakes Plain languages are a family of Papuan languages, spoken in the Lakes Plain of Indonesian New Guinea. They are notable for being heavily tonal and for their lack of nasal consonants.

Classification
The Lakes Plain languages were tentatively grouped by Stephen Wurm with the Tor languages in his Trans–New Guinea proposal.  Clouse (1997) rejected this connection to the Tor languages and grouped them with the Geelvink Bay languages. Malcolm Ross classifies the languages as an independent family, a position confirmed by Timothy Usher.

Because of the apparent phonological similarities and sharing of stable basic words such as ‘louse’, William A. Foley speculates the potential likelihood of a distant relationship shared between the Skou and Lakes Plain families, but no formal proposals linking the two families have been made due to insufficient evidence. Additionally according to Foley, based on some lexical and phonological similarities, the Keuw language (currently unclassified) may also possibly share a deep relationship with the Lakes Plain languages.

Like the East Cenderawasih Bay, Trans-New Guinea, and South Bougainville language families, Lakes Plain languages have ergative case marking systems. In contrast, most languages of northern Papua New Guinea have accusative case marking systems.

Clouse (1997)
Clouse (1997, p. 155) internally classifies the Lakes Plain family as:

Lakes Plain superstock
Rasawa stock
Rasawa-Saponi family: Rasawa, Saponi
Awera
Tariku stock
Tause family: Tause, Weirate, Deirate
West Tariku family
Fayu: Fayu, Sehudate
Kirikiri: Kirikiri, Faia
Central Tariku family
Edopi
Turu: Iau, Foi, Turu
East Tariku family: Doutai, Waritai, Kai, Biritai, Obokuitai, Eritai, Sikaritai, Kwerisa, Papasena
Duvle
East Lakes Plain family: Foau (Abawiri), Taworta, Dabra

Clouse concludes that the East Geelvink Bay languages are the most closely related to the Lakes Plain languages, forming a wider Geelvink Bay phylum with it.

Usher (2018)
The Lakes Plain languages as classified by Usher are as follows:

Not included in the above classification, Kaiy, Kwerisa, Doutai and Waritai are presumably also Central Lakes Plain; the same for Obokuitai and Biritai. Clouse had placed them closest to Papasena and to Eritai, respectively, and they might form dialect clusters with those languages.

There are particular questions about the inclusion of Saponi, Kehu and Tause.

Pronouns
The pronouns Ross reconstructs for proto-Tariku are,

{| class=wikitable
|-
| I || *a/*i || we || *a/*ai
|-
| thou || *de || you || *da
|-
| s/he || *au || they || ?
|}

The corresponding "I" and "thou" pronouns are proto–East Lake Plain *a, *do, Awera yai, nai (the latter from *dai; compare also e "we"), and Rasawa e-, de-. Saponi shares no pronouns with the Lakes Plain family; indeed its pronouns mamire "I, we" and ba "thou" are remenincent of proto–East Bird's Head *meme "we" and *ba "thou". However, Saponi shares half its basic lexical vocabulary with Rasawa, and Ross left it in the Lakes Plain family pending further investigation. The Tause language was also previously grouped amongst the Tariku group of Lakes Plain languages.  Ross transferred it to the East Bird's Head – Sentani languages on the basis of pronoun similarities in hopes that this would promote further research.

Below are pronouns in selected Lakes Plain languages as given by Foley (2018):

{| 
!  !! Awera !! Kirikiri !! Iau !! Duvle !! Obokuitai !! Diebroud
|+ Lakes Plain pronouns
|-
! 1s
| yai || a || a || æ || i || aː
|-
! 2s
| dai || de || di || do || di || daː
|-
! 1p
| e || e || e || a || ai || iː
|}

Phonology
Lakes Plain languages have remarkably small phonemic inventories, rivaling even those of Polynesian languages.

Consonants
Clouse and Clouse (1993) note many of the Lakes Plain languages share several unusual phonological features. While Papuan languages typically have at least two nasal phonemes, this is not the case for Lakes Plain languages. Although phonetic nasals do exist in most Lakes Plain languages, they do not contrast with the corresponding voiced stops. Doutai, Sikaritai, Obokuitai and Abawiri (Foau) lack even phonetic nasals. Additionally, no Lakes Plain language has a liquid phoneme. Clouse (1997) reconstructs a typologically remarkable consonant inventory for the ancestor of Lakes Plain, consisting entirely of only five stops:

This results in Lakes Plain languages having high functional load, meaning that there are many words with small distinctions in sounds.

Vowels
Many of the languages have very high constricted (fricativised) vowels; in Doutai and Kirikiri these constitute separate phonemes from /i/ and /u/. The fricativised vowels seem to have developed from deletion of a following consonant.

Clouse (1997) reconstructs a five-vowel system for proto-Lakes Plain, not unlike Japanese or Spanish:

Tone
Lakes Plain languages are all tonal. (The Skou languages and Kainantu-Goroka languages are other Papuan languages possessing contrastive tone.) Clouse and Clouse (1993) reconstruct tone (high level "H" and low level "L") in proto-Lakes Plain.

Duvle and Sikaritai have only two tones, high and low, but all other Lakes Plain languages have more than two tones. All West Tariku languages have both rising and falling tones. Abawiri (Foau) has phonological high and low tones as well as a derived mid tone.

Iau is the most tonally complex Lakes Plain language. Unlike other Lakes Plain languages which can be disyllabic or trisyllabic, Iau word structure is predominantly monosyllabic. Iau has eight phonemic tones, transcribed by Bateman using numerical Chao tones (usually used with East Asian languages): high (44), mid (33), high-rising (45), low-rising (23), high-to-low-falling (42), high-to-mid-falling (43), mid-to-low-falling (32), and falling-rising (423). Four of the eight Iau tones occur on short vowels, while the remaining four occur on long vowels and often correspond to disyllabic words in other Lakes Plain languages. (See Iau language#Tone.)

Morphology
Unlike most Papuan languages to the east, words in Lakes Plain languages do not have gender. Bauzi, an East Geelvink Bay language spoken to the northwest of the Lakes Plain family, also does not have gender. Most Lakes Plain languages are primarily analytic and isolating, with little morphology. However, there is some variation in the family. Iau is almost exclusively analytic and isolating, while Abawiri has extensive verbal morphology.

Basic vocabulary
Basic vocabulary of the Lakes Plain languages (Rasawa, Kirikiri, Iau, Duvle, Obokuitai, Diebroud) listed in Foley (2018):

{| 
|+ Lakes Plain basic vocabulary
! gloss !! Rasawa !! Kirikiri !! Iau !! Duvle !! Obokuitai !! Diebroud
|-
| ‘bird’ || beβo || du || dusi || fura || du || duː
|-
| ‘blood’ || uːyo || klu || oe || sæire || saig || ai die
|-
| ‘bone’ || weβi || kiʼ || iʼ || kæ-ri-a || -baig || butːu
|-
| ‘breast’ || tu || tu || tui || do || toub || tow
|-
| ‘ear’ || u-ra || ke || e || ovei || -kwei || ebre
|-
| ‘eat’ || ki-βaβo || sa || sa || dɪa || da- || beya
|-
| ‘egg’ || uβa || dute || bi || ævisa || ako || ko
|-
| ‘eye || ɔra || kla || ɸæ || gari || -u || ruːg
|-
| ‘fire’ || tayo || kwɛ || be || bo || kwɛ || do
|-
| ‘give’ || paro || tu || baɛ || bou || behig || bei
|-
| ‘go’ || uɣuβe || kia || i || da/dou || do- || dug
|-
| ‘ground’ || gi || ɸla || a || pɪa || hra || faː
|-
| ‘hair’ || u-kha || ta-kruʼ || iʼ-su || tæri || hoig || teri
|-
| ‘hear’ || puaβo || beika || bi-bae || bou/bæiɪ || kwɛri || atega
|-
| ‘leg’ || u-ru || ɸa || tai || fria || -hig || aigwa
|-
| ‘louse’ || piye || ɸli || i(bo) || pri || hri || fi(god)
|-
| ‘man’ || duβu || te || te || oirɛ || ta || gutːi
|-
| ‘moon’ || bariya || tɔ || baiʼdaki || vrisa || so || fere
|-
| ‘name’ || uβa || kwa || ɔsu || oiɛ || asukwa || faya
|-
| ‘one’ || kri-βi || suo-we || bisi-be || soɣo-ɛ || kore-kekaig || kwaka
|-
| ‘path, road’ || we || kwari || bɛ || ioɣoia || kuɛi || eigre
|-
| ‘see’ || paβo || ɸua/ɸori || dɔɛ || fei/fou || badub || fǝkta
|-
| ‘stone’ || pa || ɸai || ɸeki || pæxi || kwig || gwid
|-
| ‘sun’ || kuri || tɔ || baiʼ || væir || so || gwadi
|-
| ‘tongue’ || isɔːkɔ || abla || ae || zæri || -rija || iri
|-
| ‘tooth’ || ɔ || uri || biʼ || æbidi || -brig || adːi
|-
| ‘tree’ || ukui || du || u || ura || kub || gru
|-
| ‘two’ || wɔri || ɔro-we || bɔ || tɛʔɛ || tio || tai
|-
| ‘water’ || de(ye) || da || e || dæ/dɛ || -rig || dye
|-
| ‘woman’ || kuru || ko || si || oruæi || tub || ro
|}

Proto-language

Clouse (1997) reconstructs basic vocabulary for proto-Lakes Plain and other lower branches.

Lakes Plain reconstructions by Clouse (1997)

{| class="wikitable sortable"
! gloss !! proto-Lakes Plain !! proto-Far West Lakes Plain !! proto-Tariku !! proto-West Tariku !! proto-Central Tariku !! proto-East Tariku
|-
| neck || *kukro || *roko || *kokro || *kokrV ||  || *kro
|-
| mouth || *kukadi/u || *koru || *kuari || *kuari || *ba || *kua
|-
| tooth || *bri || *biri || *bri || *bri || *biri || *bri
|-
| eye || *kudatiCV || *ura || *kurati || *kurati ||  || *kuratiC
|-
| nose ||  || *boru || *boru ||  ||  || *boru
|-
| hair/fur || *kru/i ||  || *kru/i || *kru ||  || *kru/i
|-
| fingernail || *pV || *bV || *pV || *ɸV || *ɸo || *pe
|-
| skin || *ɸidi || *bi || *ɸiri || *ɸire || *iri || *bari
|-
| meat || *tV || *tV || *tV || *tV || *ta || *tV
|-
| bone ||  || *be || *kai || *kai || *i || *ai
|-
| breast || *touCV || *tou || *touC || *tou^ || *touC || *touC
|-
| stomach || *kuria || *wia || *kuria || *kuri ||  || *kuia
|-
| leg ||  || *tu || *Ca || *Ca || *ta || *a
|-
| foot ||  ||  || *to || *to ||  || *to
|-
| water || *deida || *deire || *dida || *dida || *ida || *wadi
|-
| fire || *kudaide || *tairo || *kure || *kue || *be || *kure
|-
| adjectival suffix || *-we/-die || *-we/-de || *-we/-die || *-we || *-be || *-die
|-
| stone || *kuipade || *pare || *kuiɸae || *kuiɸae || *kuiɸa || *kuip
|-
| one ||  || *kri || *keiki ||  ||  || *keiki
|-
| three || *didi || *dri || *Cidi || *Cido ||  || *tidi
|-
| land || *pra/i || *pri || *pra || *ɸra ||  || *pra
|-
| path || *kuadi || *arV || *kuari || *kuari || *ba || *kuai
|-
| wide ||  || *wara ||  ||  ||  || 
|-
| rain || *kurire || *kuie || *kuri || *kuri || *bi || 
|-
| dull || *baCu || *paupe || *baCu || *baCu || *ba || 
|-
| sun || *tio ||  || *tio || *tio || *so || *so
|-
| moon ||  || *bari ||  ||  ||  || 
|-
| banana || *kriCV || *kiri || *kriC || *kri^ || *kiri || *kriC
|-
| tree || *kuCV || *ku || *kuC || *u || *u || *kuC
|-
| split ||  || *pekeka ||  ||  ||  || 
|-
| thorn || *kude || *pore || *kure || *kure || *be || *kure
|-
| seed ||  || *weto ||  || *kaba || *ɸe || *aCi
|-
| black || *kVCa || *kuara || *kVC || *kaCa ||  || *kiC
|-
| bird || *du ||  || *du || *du || *du || *du
|-
| wing || *auCo || *uko || *auCu || *auro || *apu || *akau
|-
| cassowary || *diadi || *kiri || *diari || *diari || *diari || 
|-
| a fly || *kubadi || *poiti || *kubari || *kuari || *bari || *kuari
|-
| mosquito || *tide || *tre || *tire || *tire || *tire || *tire
|-
| dog || *tabi || *kaCo || *tabi || *tiabi || *dabi || *dabi
|-
| tail || *tiCa ||  || *tiCa || *tiCa || *tia || *tiC
|-
| fish || *tie || *te || *tie || *tie ||  || *te
|-
| leech || *kibV || *kiba || *kibi || *ki || *ki || *kibi
|-
| louse || *pri || *piri || *pri || *ɸri ||  || *pri
|-
| long ||  || *pobi || *kure || *kure || *be || *kuri
|-
| house || *kuadV || *aru || *kuarV || *kua || *urV || *kuari
|-
| near || *paipai || *paia || *aiɸai ||  ||  || *aiɸai
|-
| person || *tau || *du || *tai || *te || *te || *tai
|-
| bad ||  || *kaibe || *ɸVra || *ɸe ||  || *ɸura
|-
| child || *tau-bri || *tu-ri || *tau-bri || *tau-bri || *tau- || *tau-bi
|-
| 2SG || *de || *de || *de || *de || *di || *de
|-
| 1PL || *ai || *e || *ai || *ai || *e || *ai
|-
| 3SG ||  || *kibV ||  || *be || *o || *de
|-
| go/walk || *kidia || *dao || *kidia || *kidia || *dia || 
|-
| hear-STAT || *kuedi-kuda || *beri-kura || *kueri-kua || *beri-kua || *beri-wa || *kueri-kua
|-
| search ||  || *paka ||  ||  ||  || 
|-
| suck || *tau || *tu || *tau || *taua ||  || *betu
|-
| vomit || *kadudu || *aru || *karudu || *ku || *u || *krudu
|-
| scrape || *kiCi || *kibie || *kiri || *kiri || *iri || *bekiri
|-
| sit || *ɸuɸu || *kua || *ɸuɸu || *ɸoko || *bau || *buhu
|-
| stand || *dia-dau || *tarau || *dia-da || *dia-da ||  || 
|-
| grab || *tiadado || *suarau || *araro || *araro || *da || *do
|-
| blow || *pudV || *purV || *purV || *ɸura || *ɸoi || *bu-ɸuru
|-
| cough || *takadV || *takari || *takurV || *takuro || *taurai || *takura
|-
| firewood || *bodi ||  || *bori || *bo || *bori || 
|-
| feces || *pade ||  || *pare || *ɸa || *ɸa || *pare
|-
| urine || *tiCi ||  || *tiCi || *ti^ || *tii || *tiCi
|-
| penis || *tiuCV ||  || *tiuC || *tiu^ || *tiu || *tuC
|-
| scrotum || *kudiCV ||  || *kuriC || *kui^ ||  || *kuiC
|-
| chin || *kuaukadi ||  || *kuaukari || *kuaukai || *baukai || *kuaukari
|-
| ant || *keCV ||  || *keC || *ke || *e || *kiC
|-
| arrow || *poka ||  || *poka || *ɸoka || *ɸoka || *poka
|}

See also
List of districts of Papua for a list of districts and villages with respective languages

Further reading
Proto-Lakes-Plain. TransNewGuinea.org. From (1) Clouse, D.A. 1997. Towards a reconstruction and reclassification of the Lakes Plain languages of Irian Jaya. In Franklin, K. (ed). Papers in Papuan Linguistics No. 2. Pacific Linguistics: Canberra. ; (2) Clouse, D.A. 1993. Languages of the Western Lakes Plain. Irian, 21, 1–32.
Proto-Far West Lakes Plain. TransNewGuinea.org. From (1) Clouse, D.A. 1997. Towards a reconstruction and reclassification of the Lakes Plain languages of Irian Jaya. In Franklin, K. (ed). Papers in Papuan Linguistics No. 2. Pacific Linguistics: Canberra. ; (2) Clouse, D.A. 1993. Languages of the Western Lakes Plain. Irian, 21, 1–32.
Proto-Tariku. TransNewGuinea.org. From (1) Clouse, D.A. 1997. Towards a reconstruction and reclassification of the Lakes Plain languages of Irian Jaya. In Franklin, K. (ed). Papers in Papuan Linguistics No. 2. Pacific Linguistics: Canberra. ; (2) Clouse, D.A. 1993. Languages of the Western Lakes Plain. Irian, 21, 1–32.
Proto-West-Tariku. TransNewGuinea.org. From (1) Clouse, D.A. 1997. Towards a reconstruction and reclassification of the Lakes Plain languages of Irian Jaya. In Franklin, K. (ed). Papers in Papuan Linguistics No. 2. Pacific Linguistics: Canberra. ; (2) Clouse, D.A. 1993. Languages of the Western Lakes Plain. Irian, 21, 1–32.
Proto-Central-Tariku. TransNewGuinea.org. From (1) Clouse, D.A. 1997. Towards a reconstruction and reclassification of the Lakes Plain languages of Irian Jaya. In Franklin, K. (ed). Papers in Papuan Linguistics No. 2. Pacific Linguistics: Canberra. ; (2) Clouse, D.A. 1993. Languages of the Western Lakes Plain. Irian, 21, 1–32.
Proto-East-Tariku. TransNewGuinea.org. From (1) Clouse, D.A. 1997. Towards a reconstruction and reclassification of the Lakes Plain languages of Irian Jaya. In Franklin, K. (ed). Papers in Papuan Linguistics No. 2. Pacific Linguistics: Canberra. ; (2) Clouse, D.A. 1993. Languages of the Western Lakes Plain. Irian, 21, 1–32.

References

External links

Lakes Plain languages database at TransNewGuinea.org

 
Language families
Papuan languages
Languages of western New Guinea
Tonal languages